Marasmiellus cocophilus is a species of fungus in the family Marasmiaceae. It was described as new to science in 1969 by mycologist David Pegler. The fungus causes lethal bole rot of coconut.

References

Fungi described in 1969
Fungal plant pathogens and diseases
Coconut palm diseases
Marasmiaceae